Sebastian Sørlie Henriksen (born 31 May 2002) is a Norwegian footballer who plays as a centre-back for Egersund, on loan from Viking FK.

Career
Sørlie Henriksen joined the academy of Viking at the age of 5. On 15 May 2020, he signed a three-year contract with the club. Sørlie Henriksen has featured for Norwegian national youth teams from under-15 to under-18 level. On 8 August 2020, he was loaned out to Norwegian Second Division club Fram Larvik. He made his Eliteserien debut on 12 December 2021 against Tromsø. In March 2022, he was loaned out to Egersund.

References

External links
 
 Profile for Viking FK

2002 births
Living people
Sportspeople from Stavanger
Norwegian footballers
IF Fram Larvik players
Viking FK players
Egersunds IK players
Norwegian Third Division players
Norwegian Second Division players
Eliteserien players
Association football defenders
Norway youth international footballers
21st-century Norwegian people